Snow Cake is a 2006 indie romantic comedy drama film directed by Marc Evans and starring Alan Rickman, Sigourney Weaver, Carrie-Anne Moss, Emily Hampshire and Callum Keith Rennie. It was released on 8 September 2006 in the United Kingdom.

Filmed in Wawa, Ontario, Snow Cake is a drama about the relationship between autistic Linda (Weaver), and British tourist Alex (Rickman), who has a change of heart after a deadly automobile accident involving himself and Linda's daughter Vivienne (Hampshire).

Plot
Eccentric teenager Vivienne Freeman hitches a ride from a reluctant recluse, visiting Englishman Alex Hughes. Just when they reach her hometown of Wawa, Ontario, she is killed by a transport truck ramming their vehicle, while Alex only gets a nosebleed. Everybody confirms that this was not Alex's fault.

Alex visits Vivienne's mother, Linda, to deliver some gifts Vivienne had bought her and to provide support. She has been informed about her daughter's death a few hours before Alex's visit, but does not show any signs of grief. Linda is autistic and constantly behaves in unusual ways while showing that she fully understands what is happening around her. She has a cleanliness mania which involves her constantly making sure everything in her home is neat, and prevents her from touching garbage bags. Her problem is finding someone who will put the garbage outside to be collected (but only when the truck arrives), as this was always something done by her daughter. Linda insists that Alex stay a few days so that he can do this for her. He agrees and also arranges Vivienne's funeral.

During his stay, he begins a relationship with Linda's back fence neighbor, Maggie, who Linda mistakenly thinks is a prostitute. Wawa's Chief of Police, Clyde, is jealous of Alex's connection to Maggie, which he tries to sour by informing Maggie that Alex has just been released after serving time for killing a man.

Maggie does not ask Alex about this, but instead waits until he brings the subject up himself. Alex reveals that he punched and accidentally killed the man (he fell and cracked his head) who caused his son's death. The man had been driving drunk and hit Alex's 22-year-old son while his son was on his way to meet Alex for the first time — Alex had only recently learned about his existence, the result of a brief affair. Released from prison, Alex has flown to Timmins and is driving to Winnipeg (he was not aware of the vast distance) to see his son's mother.

Linda dislikes Maggie to the point where she initially refuses her help. But after Alex leaves to continue his journey to Winnipeg, she allows Maggie to come into her home to take out her garbage.

Cast

 Alan Rickman as Alex
 Sigourney Weaver as Linda
 Carrie-Anne Moss as Maggie
 Emily Hampshire as Vivienne
 James Allodi as Clyde
 Callum Keith Rennie as John Neil, driver of the killer truck
 David Fox as Dirk, Linda's father
 Jayne Eastwood as Ellen, Linda's mother
 Julie Stewart as Florence, an overhelpful (“bossy”) townsperson 
 Selina Cadell as Diane Wooton, a divorced townsperson

Production 
The screenwriter, Angela Pell, wrote the role of Alex Hughes with Rickman in mind. It was also Rickman who read the script and made sure Weaver (fellow Galaxy Quest co-star) was contacted about the role of Linda Freeman. Both Rickman and Weaver were runners-up at the Seattle International Film Festival for the respective prizes of Best Actor and Best Actress.

During the course of making the movie, Weaver researched the subject of autism and was coached by Ros Blackburn, a woman with the condition who is also an author and speaker about autism and Asperger's syndrome. Alan Rickman chose not to research the subject of autism in order to make his character have an impact/shock when facing Linda.

Release
The film was screened and discussed at Autism Cymru 2nd international conference in May 2006 as well as the Edinburgh International Film Festival, Tribeca Film Festival, Toronto International Film Festival, Seattle International Film Festival, among others. It was also the opening night screening for the Berlin Film Festival.

Reception
On review aggregator Rotten Tomatoes, the film holds an approval rating of 65% based on 63 reviews, with an average rating of 6.09/10. The website's critics consensus reads: "Sigourney Weaver gracefully undertakes a difficult role, while the rest of the cast lifts the histrionic plot into something worthwhile."

Awards & nominations
The film was nominated in four categories at the 27th Genie Awards in 2007:
 Best Actress: Sigourney Weaver
 Best Supporting Actress: Emily Hampshire
 Best Supporting Actress: Carrie-Anne Moss (Won)
 Cinematography: Steve Cosens

References

External links
 
 
 
 

2006 films
English-language Canadian films
2006 independent films
2006 romantic comedy-drama films
British romantic comedy-drama films
Canadian romantic comedy-drama films
British independent films
Canadian independent films
Films about autism
Films directed by Marc Evans
Films set in Northern Ontario
2000s English-language films
2000s Canadian films
2000s British films
Films about disability